Mark Maida Cannon (born June 14, 1962) is a former professional American football offensive lineman who played in the National Football League, primarily for the Green Bay Packers. He played college football at the University of Texas at Arlington.

References

External links
NFL.com player page

1962 births
Living people
Sportspeople from Whittier, California
American football centers
Texas–Arlington Mavericks football players
Green Bay Packers players
Kansas City Chiefs players
Indianapolis Colts players